Xintun may refer to the following locations in China:

Xintun, Guizhou, town in Wangmo County
Xintun Township, Hebei, in Zaoqiang County
Xintun Township, Heilongjiang, in Yi'an County
Xintun Subdistrict, Dongzhou District, Fushun, Liaoning